Bernard Wiseman (26 August 1922 – 11 January 1995) was an American author of children's books. He wrote Morris and Boris: Three Stories (1974) and other children's books. He was active from 1958 to 1995.

Early Years

Wiseman was born in the Canarsie section of Brooklyn, New York on August 26, 1922.  He joined the U.S Coast Guard during World War II. He rose to the rank of bosun's mate and saw action in the Atlantic Ocean on a destroyer escort.

Career
After being honorably discharged in 1945, Wiseman began working as a cartoonist in New York City. His work was frequently published in The New Yorker and Playboy magazine. Wiseman also created a series for Boys' Life magazine called Sir Nervous Norman, humorous stories of an insecure medieval knight. In the late 1950s and early 1960s, Wiseman began writing and illustrating early reader children's books. His first major title was The Log and Admiral Frog.  Wiseman published over 80 books, his most popular being the Morris the Moose series. Morris and his pal Boris the Bear had adventures children could relate to. They had a pun-filled Abbott and Costello relationship.

In 1977, Wiseman and his wife Susan and stepson Peter moved to Melbourne, Florida. There he had two sons of his own, Michael and Andrew.

Wiseman died in 1995. He is interred in Arlington National Cemetery.

References

1922 births
1995 deaths
American children's writers
United States Coast Guard personnel of World War II